Grissom is an unincorporated community in southern Granville County, North Carolina, United  States at the intersection of roads 1710 and 1713, south of Wilton.

Grissom is an unincorporated community located in Granville County at latitude 36.072 and longitude -78.596. The elevation is 469 feet. Grissom appears on the Grissom U.S. Geological Survey Map. Granville County is in the Eastern time zone UTC-5 and observes DST.

The Allen-Mangum House and John P. Lawrence Plantation were listed on the National Register of Historic Places in 1988.

References

 Roadside Thoughts - A visit to Grissom, North Carolina
 Absolute United States - Grissom, North Carolina
 Grissom, North Carolina

Unincorporated communities in Granville County, North Carolina
Unincorporated communities in North Carolina